The 2020 Connecticut Democratic presidential primary was originally to take place on Tuesday, April 28, 2020, was initially rescheduled to June 2, 2020 due to the COVID-19 pandemic, and was then rescheduled again for August 11, 2020. It took place on August 11, 2020 in Connecticut. The state was the only one to vote on that day in the Democratic Party presidential primaries for the 2020 presidential election, and was the last state or territory to hold a Democratic presidential primary or caucus for the year. The Connecticut primary is a closed primary, with the state awarding 75 delegates, of which 60 are pledged delegates allocated on the basis of the results of the primary.

Original procedure
Connecticut typically joined several northeastern states in holding primaries on the same date (April 28, 2020), often dubbed the "Acela primary" in reference to the namesake Amtrak service.

Voting was expected to take place throughout the state from 6:00 a.m. until 8:00 p.m. In the closed primary, candidates must meet a threshold of 15% at the congressional district or statewide level in order to be considered viable. The 60 pledged delegates to the 2020 Democratic National Convention will be allocated proportionally on the basis of the results of the primary. Of the 60 pledged delegates, between 6 and 7 are allocated to each of the state's 5 congressional districts, and another 6 are allocated to party leaders and elected officials (PLEO delegates), in addition to 11 at-large pledged delegates. These delegate totals do not account for pledged delegate bonuses or penalties from timing or clustering.

Following the primary, post-primary congressional district caucuses open to all Democratic voters would have been held on Wednesday, May 27, 2020, during which national convention district-level delegates will be selected. The state party committee would then meet in Hartford on Wednesday, June 10, 2020, to vote on the 11 pledged at-large and 6 PLEO delegates to send to the Democratic National Convention. The 60 pledged delegates Connecticut sends to the national convention were to be joined by 15 unpledged PLEO delegates (6 members of the Democratic National Committee; 7 members of Congress, including both Senators and all 5 U.S. Representatives; the governor; and former DNC chair Chris Dodd).

However, due to COVID-19 pandemic, these plans were replaced.

Rescheduling 
In mid-April, the center of the pandemic was in New York and New England, and so Governor Ned Lamont postponed its presidential primary twice, first to late June, then to August 11 — the Tuesday before the Democrats' rescheduled national convention. 

To make matters even more complex, Governor Lamont issued an executive order making absentee ballots available to all, meaning that delays in counting, which occurred in many states during the primary period, would last well after the convention was over.

Complicating things even more, in mid-July it was announced that a first-ballot would take place online, over a week-long period beginning August 3, six days before the primary was to start, giving the delegation a mere two days to be selected by the state committee as per the primary results.

Polling

Results

Results by county

Notes

References

External links
The Green Papers delegate allocation summary at TheGreenPapers.com
Connecticut Democratic Party draft delegate selection plan

Connecticut Democratic
Democratic primary
2020
Connecticut Democratic